Rafael Pasquali Rech (born 18 November 2002), commonly known as Rafinha, is a Brazilian professional footballer who plays as a forward for Juventude.

Personal life
Rafinha was born in Brisbane, Australia in 2002 while his father, Fernando was playing for the Brisbane Strikers in the National Soccer League. He left Australia for Brazil at the age of two.

Club career
After playing the 2020 Copa São Paulo de Futebol Júnior with Juventude at the age of 17, Rafinha was transferred to São Paulo, as a part of the deal which involved the loan of Gabriel Novaes in the opposite direction. After struggling with a knee injury, he returned to Juventude in 2022.

Rafinha made his first team – and Série A – debut for Juventude on 29 August 2022, coming on as a late substitute for Jadson in a 4–0 away loss against Internacional. On 7 October, he renewed his contract until October 2025.

References

External links

2002 births
Living people
Brazilian footballers
Australian soccer players
Association football forwards
Esporte Clube Juventude players
Campeonato Brasileiro Série A players